The Uzbekistan women's national volleyball team represents Uzbekistan in international women's volleyball competitions and friendly matches.

It appeared at the Asian Women's Volleyball Championship 5 times.

References

External links
Uzbekistan Volleyball Federation

National women's volleyball teams
Volleyball
Volleyball in Uzbekistan
Women's sport in Uzbekistan